Lucindale is a small town in the south-east of South Australia. At the 2006 census, Lucindale had a population of 301. The town is best known for hosting the annual South East Field Days, attracting over 26,000 visitors every March.

History
The town was proclaimed on 25 January 1877. It was named after Lady Jeannie Lucinda Musgrave—the wife of the Governor of South Australia, Anthony Musgrave. It was a station on the Kingston-Naracoorte railway line which opened around the same time and closed on 28 November 1987 then dismantled on 15 September 1991. A school was established in 1878.
The Post Office opened on 1 May 1877 but was known as Baker's Range for a few months.
  
The locality of Lucindale was proclaimed on 3 December 1998.

Today
Lucindale is home to a health centre, licensed post office and newsagent and a service station. Education from reception to Year 12 is provided by the Lucindale Area School.

The town was named Australia's tidiest town in 1994 and was a finalist in 2006.

The town hosted the triple j One Night Stand on 14 September 2019. More than 15,000 people attended.

The town has an Australian Rules football team competing in the Kowree-Naracoorte-Tatiara Football League.

In January 2021, a significant bushfire destroyed over 14,000 hectares of land surrounding the town of Lucindale. At least 4 homes were destroyed in the blaze.

Notable people from Lucindale
 Sandy Roberts – television personality and sports presenter.
 Andrew McKay (born 1970) – former player of Carlton Football Club
 Darcy Fogarty (born 1999) – Adelaide Football Club since 2018

Climate

See also
Vivigani Ardune Conservation Park

References

External links
South East Field days – official site

Towns in South Australia
Limestone Coast